Matthew Sean Wells (born November 26, 1990) is a former American football linebacker. He was drafted by the New England Patriots with the 178th pick of the 2015 NFL draft.

He played college football at Mississippi State, where he started 33 games.

Professional career

New England Patriots
Wells was drafted in the sixth round of the 2015 NFL draft by the New England Patriots.

Chicago Bears
On August 10, 2015, the Patriots traded Wells to the Chicago Bears for Ryan Groy. On September 5, 2015, he was released by the Bears.

St. Louis / Los Angeles Rams
On November 10, 2015, the St. Louis Rams signed Wells to their practice squad. On December 1, 2015, he was released from practice squad.

On June 24, 2016, Wells was released by the Rams.

Atlanta Falcons
Wells was signed by the Falcons. On September 3, 2016, he was waived by the Falcons due to final roster cuts.

Hamilton Tiger-Cats
Wells signed with the Hamilton Tiger-Cats on October 10, 2016.

Birmingham Iron
In 2018, Wells signed with the Birmingham Iron for the 2019 season. He was waived on April 1, 2019.

References

External links 
 Mississippi State Bulldogs bio

1990 births
Living people
American football linebackers
Mississippi State Bulldogs football players
New England Patriots players
Chicago Bears players
St. Louis Rams players
Atlanta Falcons players
Hamilton Tiger-Cats players
Players of American football from Mississippi
People from Monticello, Mississippi
Los Angeles Rams players
Birmingham Iron players